Colchicum corsicum is a species of flowering plant in the Colchicaceae family. It is native to the islands of Corsica and Sardinia in the Mediterranean.

Colchicum corsicum is a perennial growing from an underground corm. Some individuals have pink flowers, others white, the two very often being intermingled in different individuals within a given population.

References 

corsicum
Flora of France
Flora of Corsica
Flora of Sardinia
Plants described in 1879
Taxa named by John Gilbert Baker